Eucarya may refer to: 

Eukaryotes, organisms whose cells contain complex structures inside the membranes.
Eucarya, a formerly recognized genus of flowering plants that is now considered to be part of the genus Santalum.